Ivan Fyodorovich Koshkin (died 1427) was a boyar and Voivode at the court of Vasily I and  Vasily II. He was a son of Fedor Andreevich Kobylin and a progenitor of the Romanov dynasty. 

He had four sons: Ivan Ivanovich Koshkin, Fedor Ivanovich Koshkin, Jakov Ivanovich Koshkin, and Zahari Ivanovich Koshkin. 

Zahari Ivanovich Koshkin was an ancestor of the very first tsaritsa, Anastasia Romanovna, the wife of Tsar Ivan IV of Russia, nicknamed "the Terrible."

External links
 History of Early Romanovs

House of Romanov
1427 deaths
Year of birth unknown